Sir Arcot Ramasamy Mudaliar (14 October 1887 – 17 July 1976) was an Indian lawyer, diplomat, and statesman who was the first president of the United Nations Economic and Social Council and the 24th and last dewan of Mysore. He also served as a senior leader of the Justice Party and in various administrative and bureaucratic posts in pre- and Independent India.

He was a prominent orator and was known for his inspiring speeches.

Early life
Arcot Ramasamy Mudaliar was born in the town of Kurnool in then-Madras Presidency, British India, in a Tamil-speaking  Tuluva Vellala (Agamudaya Mudhaliyar) family. He was the eldest of a pair of twins, the other being Arcot Lakshmanaswamy Mudaliar. He had his schooling at Municipal High School, Kurnool.

He graduated from Madras Christian College and studied law at Madras Law College. On completion of his studies, he practised as a lawyer before joining the Justice Party and entering politics. Mudaliar was nominated to the Madras Legislative Council  in 1920 and served from 1920 to 1926 and as a member of the Madras Legislative Assembly from 1931 to 1934, losing to S. Satyamurti in the 1934 elections. He served as a member of the Imperial Legislative Council from 1939 to 1941, as a part of Winston Churchill's war cabinet from 1942 to 1945, and as the Indian representative in the Pacific War Council. He was India's delegate to the San Francisco Conference and served as the first president of the United Nations Economic and Social Council. He also served as the last Diwan of Mysore from 1946 to 1949.

He was an uncle to Cmdr. V.S.P. Mudaliar, a veteran of World War II.

Political career

Justice Party 
Mudaliar was a part of the Justice Party ever since its inception in 1917 and served as its general secretary. In July 1918, he went to England along with T. M. Nair and Kurma Venkata Reddy Naidu as part of the Justice Party delegation to argue in favour of communal representation and offer evidence before the Reforms Committee. The evidence was taken just before Nair's death on 17 July 1919.

All India Non-Brahmin Movement 
Mudaliar rose in stature gradually and began to be regarded as the "brain of the Justice Party". He assisted in coordinating between non-Brahmins in different parts of India and organising non-Brahmin conferences. 

Mudaliar maintained friendly relations with Shahu Maharaj and non-Brahmin leaders from Maharashtra and parts of North India and helped coordinate between and uniting leaders from different parts of India and in organising non-Brahmin conferences.  He was a participant in the Satara Non-Brahmin Conference held on 18 December 1922, presided over by Raja Rajaram III. He also participated in the All-India Non-Brahmin Conference held at Belgaum on 26 December 1924 where his oratory was appreciated. At the Seventh Non-Brahmin Conference held on 8 February 1925, he appealed for unity amongst non-Brahmins.

Following the death of Sir P.T. Theagaroya Chetty in 1925, Mudaliar functioned as the sole link between Shahu Maharaj's Satya Shodhak Samaj and the Justice Party. He assisted Raja P. Ramarayaningar in organising an All-India Non-Brahmin Confederation at Victoria Hall, Madras, on 19 December 1925. He supported the candidature of B.V. Jadhav who was eventually appointed president. On 26 December 1925, he organised a second conference at Amaravati. The conference comprised two sessions: Rajaram II presided over the first while P. Ramarayaningar presided over the second. In the second session of the Conference, Mudaliar said:

Mudaliar's utterances at this conference became the target of The Hindu, which criticised him by saying that "the speaker was desiring to produce an effect in another province, forced him to draw rather freely on his imagination".

In the elections to the Madras Legislative Council held on 8 November 1926, the Justice Party lost the elections, winning just 21 of the 98 seats in the council. Mudaliar was one of the many who met with failure in the elections. He took a temporary retirement from politics and replaced P. N. Raman Pillai as the editor of Justice, the mouthpiece of the Justice Party. Under Mudaliar, there was a tremendous growth in its circulation, and Justice became widely popular. On 1 March 1929, he appeared before the Simon Commission along with Sir A. T. Paneerselvam, another important leader of the Justice Party, to provide evidence on behalf of the Justice Party.

Administrative career

Mayor of Madras 
Mudaliar served as the mayor of Madras from 1928 to 1930.

In 1935, he resigned as the chief editor of Justice following his appointment to the Tariff Board. On 25 February 1937, he was knighted in the 1937 Coronation Honours List, by which time he was a member of the Council of the Secretary of State for India.

Member of Churchill's war cabinet 

Shortly before the Second World War broke out in 1939, Mudaliar was appointed a member of the Viceroy's Executive Council. In June 1942, he was knighted again with KCSI. In July 1942, he was appointed to Winston Churchill's war cabinet, one of the two Indians nominated to the post.

President of the UN Economic and Social Council 
Mudaliar served as India's delegate to the United Nations at the San Francisco Conference between 25 April and 26 June 1945, where he chaired the committee that discussed economic and social problems. He was elected as the first president of the Economic and Social Council during its session at Church House, London, on 23 January 1946.  Under his presidency, the council passed a resolution in February 1946 calling for an international health conference.

At the conference which was eventually held on 19 June 1946, inaugurated by Mudaliar, the World Health Organization came into being, and the constitution for the new organisation was read out and approved by delegates from 61 nations. On the expiry of his one-year term, he returned to India and became Diwan of Mysore.

Diwan of Mysore 
Mudaliar was appointed as the Dewan of Mysore in 1946 by Maharaja Jayachamaraja Wadiyar, succeeding Sir N. Madhava Rao. He presided over a very turbulent period in Mysore's and India's history.

On 3 June 1947, Earl Louis Mountbatten made a public declaration about the acceptance by the Indian leaders of partition of India into two independent dominions. This announcement had a tremendous impact on Indian states. Early in June 1947, the Mudaliar convened a press conference at Bangalore and announced that the Mysore Government had taken a decision to accede to the new dominion of India and to send its representatives to the Indian Constituent Assembly. Thereafter, British Parliament passed the Indian Independence Act, 1947 on 15 July 1947, and the bill received royal sssent on 18 July 1947. This act provided for the creation of the independent dominion of India and Pakistan on 15 Aug 1947. This act also freed the Indian states from the suzerainty of British government. There were a lot of misgivings about the lapse of suzerainty and the resultant freedom given to the over 560 Indian states. Indian leaders drafted an Instrument of Accession asking the rulers to accede to the dominion government on the three subjects of defence, communication, and external affairs.

Jayachamaraja Wadiyar executed the instrument on 9 August 1947, and the same was accepted by the Mountbatten on 16 August 1947. But this also gave impetus to the local Congress leaders to renew their demand for a responsible government. This led to an agitation known as "Mysore Chalo". There appears to be obfuscation of facts among the agitating public that the maharaja, at the advice of the diwan and his secretary Sir T. Thamboo Chetty, was refusing to join the Indian Union. The truth of the matter was that India was not a union yet. India had just become an independent dominion.

Jayachamaraja Wadiyar was one of the earliest to sign the instrument of accession. Soon, on 24 Sept 1947, he gave his assent to setting up of a government, and on 25 October 1947, K.C. Reddy became the first chief minister with a cabinet of nine ministers. Mudaliar continued to remain a link between the cabinet and the maharaja.

As Jayachamaraja Wadiyar accepted the recommendation of the constituent assembly of Mysore to accept the Constitution of India for the state, Mysore  and become a Part-B state in the soon to be formed Republic of India, and issued a proclamation to this effect on 25 Nov 1949. With this, the post of diwan was also abolished.

During his tenure as Diwan of Mysore, Mudaliar organised a number of Tamil music concerts in the kingdom in order to raise money for the restoration of the Carnatic musician Tyagaraja's tomb at Tiruvaiyaru.

Mudaliar was sent by Jawaharlal Nehru as head of the Indian delegation to New York to argue India's case in the Security Council when Hyderabad appealed to the council against accession to India and eloquently argued the case for India. The council eventually decided in favour of India.

Executive career 
On 5 January 1955, the Industrial Credit and Investment Corporation of India (ICICI) was established. Mudaliar was elected as its first chairman.

Mudaliar helped Murugappa Group setup Tube Investments of India Limited. In his later years, he served as its chairman until his death in 1976.

Murugappa Group, run by members of his family, also runs A.R.L.M. Matriculation Higher Secondary School in Cuddalore in his memory. His descendants are based out of United States, Canada, and Australia.

Honours 
Oxford University conferred him the Doctor of Civil Law, appreciating his contributions during the Second World War.

Mudaliar was awarded the Padma Bhushan in 1954 and the Padma Vibhushan in 1970.

Religious beliefs

Despite his violent tirades against the Varnashrama dharma and Hindu scriptures in his writings and editorials in the Justice, Mudaliar was known to be a staunch Vaishnavite. He regularly sported the Vaishnavite namam. Once, while offered beef during a visit to England, he refused it with horror.

Works

Notes

References
 

1887 births
1976 deaths
Administrators in the princely states of India
Madras Christian College alumni
Scientists from Karnataka
Knights Commander of the Order of the Star of India
Knights Bachelor
Indian Knights Bachelor
Diwans of Mysore
Tamil Nadu politicians
United Nations Economic and Social Council
World Health Organization officials
Recipients of the Padma Vibhushan in civil service
University of Mysore alumni
Tamil civil servants
Indian Tamil academics
Mayors of Chennai
Dewan Bahadurs
Members of the Central Legislative Assembly of India
Fellows of the Indian National Science Academy
University of Madras alumni
People from Kurnool
Indian officials of the United Nations
Members of the Council of the Governor General of India
Léon Bernard Foundation Prize laureates